The following is the complete list of countries by medal count at the International Mathematical Olympiad:

Notes
A. This team is now defunct.

References

International Mathematical Olympiad
International Mathematical Olympiad, medal count